Gayil may be,

Gayil language
Gayil Nalls